Saint Proculus (d. ca. 320 AD) was a bishop of Verona who survived the persecutions of Diocletian. He died of natural causes at Verona.

Traditional narrative
During the Diocleian persecution, Proculus, bishop of Verona went to the prison to encourage Firmus and Rusticus. He was bound and brought with them before Anulinus, the consul. However, as Proculus was elderly, Anulinus did not consider him worth his interest, and had him released, beaten, and driven from the city. He lived to survive the persecutions.

Veneration

Attached to the Basilica di San Zeno in Verona is the Church of San Procolo housing the relics of Saint Proculus. It dates from the 6th or 7th century, being erected in the Christian necropolis across the Via Gallica. It is first mentioned, however, only in 845.
In San Zaccaria in Venice - life-size wooden statue "Proculus of Verona" (1451). 
In 1704, Sebastiano Ricci executed in Venice a canvas of "San Procolo" for Bergamo Cathedral.

See also
Diocese of Verona

References

External links
 Saint of the Day, December 9: Proculus of Verona at SaintPatrickDC.org
 Church of San Procolo
 Prokulus

3rd-century births
320 deaths
Italian saints
Bishops of Verona
4th-century Italian bishops
4th-century Christian saints